The 2016–17 Gamma Ethniki was the 34th season since the official establishment of the third tier of Greek football in 1983.
It started on 11 September 2016 and ended at May 2017.

61 teams were separated into four groups, according to geographical criteria.

Ethnikos Neo Agioneri, Zakynthos and Doxa Nea Manolada withdrew from the league before the group draw.

Group 1

Teams

Standings

Group 2

Teams

Standings

Group 3

Teams

Standings

Group 4

Teams

Standings

References

Third level Greek football league seasons
3
Greece